Fortuna station is a station along the SEPTA Lansdale/Doylestown Line. It is located near the corner of North Broad Street and Cowpath Road (Route 463) in Hatfield, Pennsylvania, United States. Cowpath Road was originally an actual cow path. In FY 2013, Fortuna station had a weekday average of 60 boardings and 103 alightings. As part of an out of court settlement with the owners of a cow killed by a Reading Railroad train at the crossing, the station was named Fortuna in honor of the deceased cow.

Station layout

References

External links

SEPTA – Fortuna Station
December 28, 2001 Bob Vogel photo (NYC Subways.org)
 Station from Cowpath Road from Google Maps Street View

SEPTA Regional Rail stations
Stations on the Doylestown Line
Railway stations in Montgomery County, Pennsylvania